This is a list of the National Register of Historic Places listings in Archer County, Texas.

This is intended to be a complete list of properties listed on the National Register of Historic Places in Archer County, Texas. There is one property listed on the National Register in the county. This property is a State Antiquities Landmark and includes two Recorded Texas Historic Landmarks.

Current listings

The locations of National Register properties may be seen in a mapping service provided.

|}

See also

National Register of Historic Places listings in Texas
Recorded Texas Historic Landmarks in Archer County

References

External links

Archer County, Texas
Archer County
Buildings and structures in Archer County, Texas